Verena Rieser (born 1979) is a German computer scientist specialising in natural-language generation, including conversational modelling as well as studies of how gender cues in synthetic language can trigger biases in the people who interact with them. She is a professor in the School of Mathematical and Computer Sciences at Heriot-Watt University in Edinburgh, where she directs the Natural Language Processing Laboratory.

Education and career
After beginning her university studies in literature, Rieser switched to linguistics, and earned a master's degree in applied linguistics and information science from the University of Regensburg in 2003. She earned a second master's degree in informatics from the University of Edinburgh in 2005, supervised by Johanna Moore, and completed a Ph.D. in computational linguistics at Saarland University in 2008.

After returning to the University of Edinburgh as a postdoctoral researcher, she became an assistant professor at Heriot-Watt University in 2011, and was promoted to Professor of Artificial Intelligence there in 2017.

In 2020 she became co-founder of a company, ALANA AI, for which she works part-time.

Book
With Oliver Lemon, Rieser is a coauthor of the book Reinforcement Learning for Adaptive Dialogue Systems: A Data-driven Methodology for Dialogue Management and Natural Language Generation (Springer, 2011)

References

External links
Home page

1979 births
Living people
German computer scientists
German women computer scientists
British computer scientists
British women computer scientists
Computational linguistics researchers
University of Regensburg alumni
Alumni of the University of Edinburgh
Saarland University alumni
Academics of Heriot-Watt University
Natural language processing researchers